Aurélia Nguyen is a French-Vietnamese public health official, and the current managing Director of the COVAX Facility at Gavi (formerly Global Alliance for Vaccines and Immunization.). In her role at COVAX, she works on providing COVID-19 vaccines to lower income countries, and tackling issues such as vaccine diplomacy, exports controls, limited supplies and cold-chain logistics.

Education and career 
Nguyen received a master's degree in health policy, planning and finance London School of Economics and the from the London School of Hygiene and Tropical Medicine (LSHTM). She worked for the World Health Organization where she conducted research on medical policies. Between 1999 and 2010, she worked at GlaxoSmithKline and led the development of policies on access to medications and vaccines in the developing world.

She joined Gavi in 2011, where she worked find ways to support financially sustainable vaccine programs and markets, and notably worked on strategies to supply Ebola vaccines and HPV vaccines against cervical cancer to developing countries. In October 2020, she was appointed managing director of the Office of the COVAX Facility.

References 

Living people
Year of birth missing (living people)
Place of birth missing (living people)
Alumni of the London School of Economics
Alumni of the London School of Hygiene & Tropical Medicine